The Alaska Folk Festival is an annual celebration of the music of Alaska, the Northwestern United States, and Canada, established in 1975. It is organised by The Alaska Folk Festival Inc., which is a non-profit membership organisation dedicated to the encouragement, support, and perpetuation of music in Alaska. The festival is held in Juneau, Alaska, most commonly in April, and lasts for a week. Its functioning is supported solely by volunteers and donations.

The festival is a celebration of music by folks. Folk music is an important component, but all types of music are encouraged. Some acts include dance and poetry. There are limits imposed due to the short length of sets. Limits include no overly long setup times, and no use of recorded music.

The Festival has performances from a variety of solo artists and musical groups, and it provides workshops for people interested in the music. There are also dances, jams, singer/songwriter showcases, and other events. All events are free to the public, with no auditions for the acts, but they must apply in time.

The only limitation on musical style is the 15 minutes allocated for each act. Performers are not paid, with the exception of one guest artist who is selected annually to perform for two 45 minute sets and do workshops. There are 9 concerts over a week, with about 15 acts at each concert.

The Festival starts April 4, 2022.

See also
 Music of Alaska
 Folk Festival

External links
 Official site - AkFolkFest.org

1975 establishments in Alaska
Annual events in Alaska
Culture of Juneau, Alaska
Music festivals in Alaska
Folk festivals in the United States
Non-profit organizations based in Juneau, Alaska
Tourist attractions in Juneau, Alaska